Robert Martin "Bob" Novogratz (born March 28, 1937) is a former American football player. He played college football at the guard and linebacker positions for the Army Cadets football team from 1957 to 1958.  He was selected by the Football Writers Association of America as a first-team guard on its 1958 College Football All-America Team. He also won the Knute Rockne Memorial Trophy as the outstanding lineman of the 1958 college football season. The Army football team compiled a 15-2-1 record during his two seasons with the team. He is the father of Mike, Robert Jr. and Jacqueline Novogratz.

References 

1937 births
Living people
Puerto Rican players of American football
American football guards
Army Black Knights football players